The A4095 is a British A road from Faringdon  to Bicester forming the northwest part of Bicester's ring road before it becomes the A4421.

Route
The A4095 passes through Witney, Long Hanborough, the A44 near Woodstock and Oxford Airport, Kirtlington, Chesterton.

History
The road was designated in the 1922. .

References

Roads in England
Roads in Oxfordshire